Roza Atamuradovna Bazarova (born 1933) was a Soviet-Turkmenistani politician and member of the Communist Party of the Soviet Union.

She was a Member of the Presidium of the Supreme Soviet between 1975 and 1989. She served as Deputy Premier Minister in 1975, and Minister of Foreign Affairs from 1985 to 1988. She was nominally President of the Republic (President of the Presidium of the Turkmenian SSR) between 10 September 1988 and 11 May 1990.

References

1933 births
20th-century Turkmenistan women politicians
20th-century Turkmenistan politicians
Communist Party of Turkmenistan politicians
Living people
People's commissars and ministers of the Turkmen Soviet Socialist Republic

Soviet women in politics